Adrian Youings (born Romford, 30 July 1965) is a British Anglican priest who has been the Archdeacon of Bath in the Diocese of Bath and Wells since his collation on 5 November 2017.

Early life and education
Youings studied biological sciences at Exeter University, graduating with a Bachelor of Science (BSc) degree in 1986. He then undertook a PhD in yeast physiology at the University of Bath. His doctoral thesis was completed in 1990 and was titled "Anaerobic growth of Saccharomyces cerevisiae with respect to uptake of cholesterol and cider fermentation". From 1993 to 1996, he studied theology and trained for ordained ministry at Wycliffe Hall, Oxford.

Ordained ministry
He was ordained deacon in 1996, and priest in 1997. After curacies in Dorking and Croydon he was the Rector of Trull from 2005 to 2017, and Rural Dean of Taunton from 2015 to 2017.

References

1951 births
Alumni of the University of Exeter
Alumni of the University of Bath
Alumni of Wycliffe Hall, Oxford
Archdeacons of Bath
Living people